Eucalyptus jimberlanica, commonly known as Norseman gimlet, is a species of mallet or a tree and is endemic to a small area in the Goldfields-Esperance region of Western Australia. It has smooth, brownish bark, lance-shaped adult leaves, flower buds in groups of seven and conical to cup-shaped fruit.

Description
It has smooth, glossy dark brown to copper-coloured bark on the trunk and branches.

This eucalypt is one of nine species of gimlet in the genus Eucalyptus. It is regarded by some as a possible hybrid between E. terebra and E. ravida.

Taxonomy and naming
Eucalyptus jimberlanica was first formally described by Lawrence Johnson and Kenneth Hill in 1991 and the description was published in the journal Telopea. The type specimen was collected from Jimberlana Hill, north east of Norseman by Hill, Johnson and Donald Frederick Blaxell in 1983.

Distribution and habitat
The Norseman gimlet is found on valley edges in a small area in the Goldfields-Esperance region of Western Australia near Norseman where it grows in loamy soils.

Conservation status
This eucalypt is classified as "Priority One" by the Government of Western Australia Department of Parks and Wildlife, meaning that it is known from only one or a few locations which are potentially at risk.

See also
List of Eucalyptus species

References

jimberlanica
Endemic flora of Western Australia
Mallees (habit)
Myrtales of Australia
Eucalypts of Western Australia
Trees of Australia
Goldfields-Esperance
Critically endangered flora of Australia
Plants described in 1991
Taxa named by Lawrence Alexander Sidney Johnson
Taxa named by Ken Hill (botanist)